Primm Springs is an unincorporated community in Hickman County, Tennessee, United States. Its ZIP code is 38476.

Primm Springs took its name from a stream which was named for John T. Primm, an original owner of the surrounding land.

Notes

Unincorporated communities in Hickman County, Tennessee
Unincorporated communities in Tennessee